Kwame Brown (born July 4, 1993), better known by his stage name Foogiano, is an American rapper  signed to Gucci Mane's record label 1017 Records. He is best known for his track "Molly (Baby Mama)”, which received a remix with DaBaby. He released his debut studio album, Gutta Baby, on November 26, 2020.

Early life and career 
Brown was born in Greensboro, Georgia.

Brown gained recognition with his single "Molly", which later received a remix with fellow rapper DaBaby in September 2020. He released his debut studio album, Gutta Baby, on November 26, 2020. The album debuted and peaked at number one on the Billboard Heatseekers Albums chart, marking Brown's first charting project.

He grew up listening to T.I., Lil Wayne and Gucci Mane. His favorite rapper is Drake.

Controversies 
In March 2021, while in jail, singer Trey Songz posted pictures of Brown's girlfriend, rapper Renni Rucci. Brown responded by threatening to attack Trey once he got out of jail.

Legal issues 
In 2013, Brown was arrested on burglary and robbery charges and was sentenced in 2014, serving three years in jail before getting out.

In September 2020, Brown and label CEO Gucci Mane were named in a wrongful death lawsuit stemming from a shooting that occurred in July of that year, which left two people dead.

In December 2020, Brown was arrested for possession of a firearm by a convicted felon. On a December 14 hearing, a judge set his bail at $50,000, with the requirements that he wear an ankle monitor and stay inside the state of Georgia. However, Brown burned off his ankle monitor, leading to a warrant being issued for his arrest. In March 2021, Brown was arrested by federal agents in Memphis, Tennessee, after being on the run for three months. In May 2021, Brown was sentenced to five years in prison on charges related to his previous charges.

Personal life 
Brown was in a relationship with fellow rapper, Renni Rucci.

Discography

Studio albums

Compilation albums

Mixtapes

Singles

As lead artist

As featured artist

Guest appearances

References 

21st-century American rappers
American hip hop singers
American rappers
American male rappers
American male songwriters
Living people
Atlantic Records artists
African-American male rappers
1993 births
Southern hip hop musicians
African-American songwriters
21st-century American male musicians
21st-century African-American musicians
Rappers from Georgia (U.S. state)
People from Greensboro, Georgia